Conundrum may refer to:

 A riddle, whose answer is or involves a pun or unexpected twist, in particular
 Riddle joke, a riddle that constitutes a set-up to the humorous punch line of a joke
 A logical postulation that evades resolution, an intricate and difficult problem

Literature 
 Conundrum (Lyons novel), a 1994 Doctor Who novel by Steve Lyons
 Conundrum (Dragonlance novel), a 2001 Dragonlance fantasy novel by Jeff Crook
 Conundrum, a memoir written by Jan Morris
 Conundrum Press (disambiguation), two book publishing companies in North America
 Conundrum, a supervillain who appeared in the Spider-Man comic books

Other fields 
 "Conundrum" (song), an instrumental song by Jethro Tull on their album Bursting Out
 "Conundrum" (Dallas), the two-hour series finale of primetime soap opera Dallas
 "Conundrum" (Star Trek: The Next Generation), a 1992 fifth-season episode of Star Trek: The Next Generation
 The Conundrum, a mountain unicycle made by Surly Bikes
 Conundrum, an NSA code word for Chrononaut Frank B. Parker in the television series Seven Days
 HMS Conundrum, the unofficial name of floating drums used to lay undersea oil pipelines between England and France during World War II

See also
 Hidden faces, the perception or recognition of faces in something essentially different
 Mechanical puzzle, a puzzle presented as a set of mechanically interlinked pieces
 Disentanglement puzzle, a type of mechanical puzzle that involves disentangling one piece or set of pieces